Our Man in Havana may refer to:

Our Man in Havana (1958), novel by Graham Greene
Our Man in Havana (film) (1959), film based on the novel
Our Man in Havana (opera) (1963), opera based on the novel
Our Man in Havana (2007), play by Clive Francis based on the novel

See also